Hukuchivirus is a genus of double-stranded DNA viruses that infect thermophilic bacteria. The genus was previously named Gammasphaerolipovirus.

Taxonomy
The genus contains the following species:

 Hukuchivirus IN93
 Hukuchivirus P23-77

Morphology
The virus particle, called a virion, of viruses in the genus has a capsid that is icosahedral in shape. The capsid contains an internal lipid membrane between the capsid and the genome, which is in the center of the virion.

References

Virus genera